The following is a list of notable deaths in April 2001.

Entries for each day are listed alphabetically by surname. A typical entry lists information in the following sequence:
 Name, age, country of citizenship at birth, subsequent country of citizenship (if applicable), reason for notability, cause of death (if known), and reference.

April 2001

1
Robert Aagaard, 68, British youth movement founder and furniture maker.
Jean Anderson, 93, English actress (The Brothers, Tenko).
Olivia Barclay, 81, British astrologer.
Eugênio German, 70, Brazilian chess master and Brazilian chess champion (1951, 1972).
Jayant Kothari, 71, Indian literary critic.
Jo-Jo Moore, 92, American baseball player.
Brendan O'Reilly, 71, Irish broadcaster.
Jim Proudfoot, 67, Canadian sports journalist.
Valerie Scott, 83, English tennis player.
Trịnh Công Sơn, 62, Vietnamese musician and composer.
Zellio Toppazzini, 71, Canadian ice hockey player.
Harvey C. Tschirgi, 92, United States Marine with the rank of Brigadier General.
Larry Tucker, 66, American screenwriter (Bob & Carol & Ted & Alice).
Jalil Zandi, 49, Iranian flying ace, car accident.

2
Charles Daudelin, 80, French-Canadian sculptor and painter.
Gary Gearhart, 77, American baseball player.
Carlos C. Ogden, 83, US Army officer and recipient of the Medal of Honor.
Letty M. Wickliffe, 99, African-American educator.

3
Michael Berry, Baron Hartwell, 89, British newspaper proprietor.
Dempster Jackson, 70, American Olympic rower (men's coxless four rowing at the 1952 Summer Olympics)(.
Jason Massey, 28, American convicted murderer, execution by lethal injection.
Butch Moore, 63, Irish singer and a showband icon, heart attack.
Ray Osrin, 72, American comic book artist and cartoonist, complications due to heart disease and diabetes.
Adela Reta, 79, Uruguyan lawyer and politician.

4
Beryl Gilroy, 76, British pioneering teacher and novelist, heart attack.
José M. Dávila Monsanto, 95, Puerto Rican politician and lawyer.
Liisi Oterma, 86, Finnish astronomer.
Stark Ritchie, 84, American football player and attorney.
Ed "Big Daddy" Roth, 69, American artist, cartoonist,  and custom car designer and builder.

5
Benjy Dial, 57, American football player.
Sir Kingsley Dunham, 91, British geologist.
Sonya Hedenbratt, 70, Swedish singer and actress.
John Bertram Oakes, 87, American journalist.
Aldo Olivieri, 90, Italian football goalkeeper and manager.
David Lloyd Owen, 83, British army general and writer.
Malcolm Shepherd, 82, British politician who served as Leader of the House of Lords.
Brother Theodore, 94, German-American actor and comedian.
John Long Wilson, 87, American physician and academic.

6
George Bull, 71, British journalist and writer.
Danny Gaither, 62, American gospel singer (Bill Gaither Trio).
Devi Lal, 85, Indian politician and Deputy Prime Minister of India.
William S. Laughlin, 81, American anthropologist.
Esperanza la del Maera, 79, Spanish flamenco singer.
Charles Pettigrew, 37, American singer, half of R&B duo Charles & Eddie, cancer.

7
David Graf, 50, American actor (Police Academy, The West Wing, Rules of Engagement).
Kurt Hohenemser, 95, German-born American aerospace engineer and a pioneer in helicopter design.
Sir Derek Lang, 87, British Army general.
Beatrice Straight, 86, American actress (Network, The Crucible, The Nun's Story), Oscar winner (1980).

8
Frank Annunzio, 86, American politician.
Arthur Cantor, 81, American theatrical producer.
Pedro Depestre, 55, Cuban violinist, arranger and musical director.
Safiya Henderson-Holmes, 50, African-American poet.
Elsie Locke, 88, New Zealand writer, historian, and feminist.
Clyde Packer, 65, Australian politician and businessman, heart and lung failure.
Van Stephenson, 47, American singer-songwriter, melanoma.
Marguerite Viby, 91, Danish actress.

9
J. Paul Emerson, 58, American radio personality.
Colin Radford, 66, English philosopher.
Shakoor Rana, 65, Pakistani cricket umpire.
Ken Rattenbury, 80, English jazz trumpeter.
Willie Stargell, 61, American baseball player, member of the Baseball Hall of Fame.
Hsieh Tung-min, 93, Taiwanese politician and Vice President of the Republic of China.

10
Elizabeth Bugie, 80, American biochemist.
Tadeusz Chciuk-Celt, 84, Polish special forces operative during World War II,  journalist and author.
Nora Eddington, 77, American actress and socialite.
John M. Edmond, 57, Scottish-American MIT professor of marine geochemistry and oceanography.
Andy Farkas, 84, American footballer.
Michel Fribourg, 87, Belgian-American billionaire businessman.
Derek Lambert, 71, English author.
Robert Moon, 83, American postal inspector, considered the father of the ZIP Code.
Nyree Dawn Porter, 65, New Zealand actress.
Richard Evans Schultes, 86, American ethnobotanist.
Mysore A. Viswamitra, 68, Indian molecular biophysicist and crystallographer, heart attack.

11
Sandy Bull, 60, American folk musician and composer.
John Harris, Baron Harris of Greenwich, 71, British political aide and politician (Chief Whip in the House of Lords from 1994 to 2001).
Sir Thaddeus McCarthy, 93, New Zealand jurist.
Graciela Naranjo, 84, Venezuelan singer and actress.
Carolyn R. Payton, 75, American director of the Peace Corps (1977-1978)
Sir Harry Secombe, 79, Welsh actor, comedian, member of The Goon Show, prostate cancer.
J. T. Putney, 72, American NASCAR race car driver, heart attack.
Jack Wilson, 83, American footballer.

12
Harvey Ball, 79, American inventor of the smiley.
Edmund W. Barker, 80, Singaporean politician and lawyer.
Nelson Burbrink, 79, American baseball player.
Jane Flanders, 61, American poet, cancer.
Mahmoud Tounsi, 56, Tunisian author and painter.

13
Celeste De Blasis, 54, American author of historical romance novels.
George Forrester, 66, Scottish footballer.
Jimmy Logan, 73, Scottish comedian, actor, producer and director.
Stephen C. O'Connell, 85, American jurist.
Josephine Premice, 74, Haitian-American actress and singer.
Ken Weston, 53, British sound engineer.

14
Jim Baxter, 61, Scottish football player.
János Holup, 78, Hungarian Olympic shooter (men's 50 metre rifle three positions at the 1960 Summer Olympics).
Eric de Kolb, 85, Austrian-American visual artist and jewelry and fashion designer.
Dorothee Metlitzki, 86, German-American author, professor of English and zionist.
Bryan Ranft, 83, British historian.
Hideo Takubo, 73, Japanese writer.
Hiroshi Teshigahara, 74, Japanese avant-garde filmmaker (Woman in the Dunes, The Face of Another).

15
Donald Dorfman, 67, American mathematical psychologist and radiologist.
Jack Elway, 69, American college football player and coach (Washington State, San Jose State, Stanford).
Fritz Müller, 80, German nazi officer and later East Germany official.
Joey Ramone, (b. Jeffrey Hyman), 49, American musician, lead singer for The Ramones, lymphoma.
Bo Roberson, 65, American track and field athlete, football player and Olympian.

16
Horace Gwynne, 88, Canadian boxer and Olympic champion.
Alfred Horn, 83, American mathematician.
Eigo Kawashima, 48, Japanese singer-songwriter and actor, liver disease.
Henry Lloyd, 89, British Anglican priest, Dean of Truro (1960–1981).
Andrew Lyght, 44, Guyanese cricketer, cancer.
Peter Maag, 81, Swiss conductor.
John R. McNamara, 73,  American naval officer and bishop.
Robert Osterloh, 82, American actor.
Mohammad Rabbani, Afghani politician and one of the founders of the Taliban, liver cancer.
Hank Riebe, 79, American baseball player.
Michael Ritchie, 62, American film director (The Bad News Bears, Fletch, Downhill Racer).
Thomas H. Stix, 76, American physicist.
Alec Stock, 84, English footballer and football manager.

17
Merton E. Davies, 83, American astronomer and space exploration pioneer.
John Ferraro, 76, American politician (Los Angeles City Council) and college football player (USC).
Sri Sadiq Ali, Indian freedom fighter and politician.
Terry Scully, 68, British theatre and television actor.
Arthur A. Seeligson Jr., 80, American oilman and rancher.
Danica Seleskovitch, 79, French interpreter and academic writer.

18
Khursheed Bano, 87, Indian singer and actress.
Tony Bartley, 82, British film and television executive, and fighter pilot.
Denmark Groover Jr., 78, American politician.
Willie Haggart, 40, Jamaican mobster, shot.
John Yonakor, 79, American football player.

19
Lionel Abel, 90, American playwright ("Absalom"), essayist and theater critic.
André du Bouchet, 77, French poet.
Egor Popov, 88, Russian-born American civil engineer.
Meldrim Thomson, Jr., 89, American politician, Governor of New Hampshire (1973–1979).

20
Richard H. Austin, 87, American politician, Michigan Secretary of State (1971–1994).
Kenneth Colby, American psychiatrist and computer technology pioneer.
David Gilbarg, 82, American professor emeritus of mathematics at Stanford University.
Herbert Hamel, 96, Canadian professional ice hockey player (Toronto Maple Leafs).
Maria Karnilova, 80, American ballet dancer and actress (Tony Award for Best Featured Actress in a Musical for Fiddler on the Roof).
Avigdor Miller, 92, American Haredi rabbi and author.
Bert Sutcliffe, 77, New Zealand cricketer.
Kershasp Tehmurasp Satarawala, 85, Indian civil servant and diplomat.

21
Ian Campbell, 12th Duke of Argyll, 63, British aristocrat.
Claude Clark, 85, American painter and printmaker.
Jack Haley Jr., 67, American film producer, director (That's Entertainment!) and documentarian.
Doug Jamerson, 53, American politician and education commissioner, cancer.
Edmund Malecki, 86, German international footballer.
Jo-Jo Moore, 92, American baseball layer.
Ulla Poulsen, 96, Danish ballerina and actress.
Giuseppe Sinopoli, 54, Italian conductor and composer.
Sandy Ullrich, 79, Cuban baseball player.
Hal White, 82, American baseball player.

22
John F. Allen, 92, Canadian physicist.
Hildegard Brom-Fischer, 92, Dutch textile artist.
Trevor de Cleene, 68, New Zealand politician and lawyer, cancer.
Shane Clements, 42, Australian cricketer, suicide.
Ike Cole, 73, American jazz pianist and composer, cancer.
George R. Hill III, 79, American chemist, cancer.
Sir Paul Holder, 89, British air marshal.
Fadil Hoxha, 85, Kosovar politician.
Edward Muhl, 94, Motion picture executive.
Heiko Oberman, 70, Dutch historian and theologian.
Wesley C. Salmon, 75, American philosopher of science, car crash.
Charles Schreiner III, 74, American rancher, author, publisher and historian, heart attack.

23
Electra Waggoner Biggs, 88, American heiress, socialite and sculptor.
Guglielmo Biraghi, 73, Italian film critic and film festival director.
Robert J. Huber, 78, American politician (U.S. Representative for Michigan's 18th congressional district from 1973 to 1975).
Sir Charles Madden, 94, British admiral.
R. A. C. Parker, 73, British historian.
David M. Walker, 56, American astronaut.

24
Lindsay Daen, 78, New Zealand sculptor and artist.
Al Hibbler, 85, American singer (Duke Ellington Orchestra).
Shailesh Matiyani, 69, Hindi writer, poet and essayist.
Peter Nugent, 63, Australian politician.
Josef Peters, 87, German racing driver.
Marion Stirling Pugh, 89, American archaeologist.
Leon Sullivan, 78, American civil rights leader, social activist and Baptist minister, leukemia.
Paul Thieme, 96, German indologist.
Johnny Valentine, 72, American professional wrestler.
Li Yuqin, 72, Chinese noble and fourth wife of emperor Puyi.

25
Michele Alboreto, 44, Italian race car driver, car crash.
Kow Nkensen Arkaah, 73, Ghanaian politician, Vice-President (1993–1997).
Viktor Bannikov, 62, Soviet/Ukrainian football player and official.
Rita Barisse, 83, British journalist and writer.
Chhaya Devi, Indian film actress.
Gwen Frostic, 94, American artist, entrepreneur and author.
Majda Potokar, 71, Slovenian actress.

26
Marjorie Arnfield, 70, British artist.
Edwin Jackson Anafi Asomaning, 70, Ghanaian plant physiologist.
Henry Boltinoff, 87, American cartoonist.
Guy Butler, 83, South African poet, academic and writer.
Allan Hall, 71, British journalist.
Lili Massaferro, 74, Argentine actress and Montoneros militant, thrombophlebitis.
Amrit Nahata, 72, Indian politician and film maker.
Edward F. Rector, 84, United States Air Force officer and flying ace during World War II, heart attack.
Edwin W. Shaar, 86, American writer, graphic artist and typeface designer.
Rudolf Trenkel, 83, German fighter pilot and flying ace during World War II.
Elisabeth Tschermak-Woess, 84, Austrian cytologist and phycologist.
Jim Ward, 53, American football coach, heart attack.

27
Charlie Applewhite, 68, American singer and radio host.
Wayne Davenport, 94, American gridironfootball player.
Ernie Graham, 54, Northern Irish singer, guitarist and songwriter.
Jack Murdock, 78, American actor (Rain Man, Altered States, Any Which Way You Can), emphysema.
Richard M. Scammon, 85, American political scientist and author, Alzheimer's disease.

28
Paul Daneman, 75, British actor (Not in Front of the Children, The Professionals, How I Won the War).
Erica Green, 3, American child abuse victim, murdered.
Ken Hughes, 79, English film director, writer and producer (Chitty Chitty Bang Bang).
Marie Jahoda, 94 Austrian-British social psychologist.
Evelyn Künneke, 79, German singer and actress.
James Still, 94, American poet, novelist and folklorist.
Bako Touré, 61, Mali football player.

29
Alexander Baldin, 75, Russian physicist.
Barend Biesheuvel, 81, Dutch politician, cardiovascular disease.
Dubai Millennium, 5, Thoroughbred racehorse, grass sickness.
Rita Hunter, 67, British operatic dramatic soprano.
Andy Phillip, 79, American basketball player.
Babu Chiri Sherpa, 35, Nepal sherpa mountaineer, fall when climbing Mount Everest.
Carlos Spaht, 94, American judge.
Gordon Watson, 87, English football player.

30
Andreas Kupfer, 86, German football player.
Maladi, 88, Indonesian athlete, songwriter, and politician.
Brian Morris, Baron Morris of Castle Morris, 70, British poet, academic and politician.
Laura Russo, 86, Brazilian librarian.
Frank Stewart, 94, American baseball player.

References 

2001-04
 04